Lachlan Bassett (born 4 November 1999) is an Australian male canoeist who was a finalist at the senior level at the 2018 and 2019 Wildwater Canoeing World Championships.

Lachlan Bassett has also been a Paddle Australia Athlete since 2015 where he competed in his first ICF Wildwater World Championships in the United States as well as a Canoe Slalom world championships in 2016, 2017 and 2020. As well as being on the senior Wildwater World championships team he was a reserve Team member for The 2019 U23 National Canoe Slalom Team and selected for the 2020 U23 Canoe Slalom World championships. Lachlan has come 5th, 6th, 6th, 9th at Two World Championships, as well as coming 30th and 23rd at Canoe Slalom World Championships.

Results
Past Results
Wildwater - C2M
 2015 World Championships Sprint - Bryson City, US - 6th
 2015 World Championships Classic - Bryson City, US - 5th
 2017 World Championships Sprint - Murau, Austria- 9th
 2017 World Championships Classic - Murau, Austria- 6th 
 2018 Wildwater Sprint Grand Prix - Penrith, Australia - 1st
 2019 Wildwater National Championships Wildwater Classic Race -Tasmania, Australia - 1st
 2019 Wildwater National Championships Wildwater Sprint Race- Run 1 -Tasmania, Australia - 1st
 2019 Wildwater National Championships Wildwater Sprint Race- Run 2 -Tasmania, Australia - 1st

Canoe Slalom - C1M

 2016 World Championships - Krakow, Poland - 30th
 2017 World Championships - Bratislava, Slovakia - 23rd
 2018 Australian Open - Sydney, Australia - 24th
 2019 Senior Canoe Slalom National Championships - Tasmania, Australia- 5th overall 3rd U23
 2019 Australian Open - Sydney, Australia - 29th
 2019 Oceania Open - Sydney, Australia - 17th
 2019 New Zealand Canoe Slalom Nationals - Kawerau, New Zealand - 2nd

References

External links

 
 Paddlers bound for American contest
 Lachlan Bassett | Paddle Australia

1999 births
Living people
Australian male canoeists
Place of birth missing (living people)